Lou Yiwen was a Chinese politician. She was among the first group of women elected to the Legislative Yuan in 1948.

Biography
Originally from Yuyao in Zhejiang Province, Lou attended  and later studied in France. In 1931 she married Huang Yanzhen.

In the 1948 elections to the Legislative Yuan, Lou was a candidate in Guangxi Province and was elected to parliament. After she failed to attend the fifth and six sessions, her membership was cancelled in 1951; the whereabouts of her substitute Wang Ruihua was unknown and the seat left vacant.

References

Date of birth unknown
20th-century Chinese women politicians
Members of the 1st Legislative Yuan
Date of death unknown